Anatoly Arkadyevich Mikhaylov (14 September 1936 – 13 June 2022) was a Soviet athlete.

He competed mainly in the 110-metre hurdles. He trained in Leningrad at Zenit and later at VSS Trud.

He competed for the USSR in the 1964 Summer Olympics held in Tokyo, Japan, in the 110-metre hurdles where he won the bronze medal.

References

External links
 

1936 births
2022 deaths
Russian male hurdlers
Soviet male hurdlers
Athletes from Saint Petersburg
Olympic bronze medalists for the Soviet Union
Athletes (track and field) at the 1956 Summer Olympics
Athletes (track and field) at the 1960 Summer Olympics
Athletes (track and field) at the 1964 Summer Olympics
Olympic athletes of the Soviet Union
European Athletics Championships medalists
Medalists at the 1964 Summer Olympics
Olympic bronze medalists in athletics (track and field)
Universiade medalists in athletics (track and field)
Universiade gold medalists for the Soviet Union
Medalists at the 1961 Summer Universiade